Huilong is a town under the administration of Hanchuan City in east-central Hubei province, China, situated  northeast of Xiantao and about  west of Wuhan. , it has one residential community and nine villages under its administration.

Administrative divisions

One community:
 Huilong Community

Nineteen villages:
 Yangzhan, Sanyuan, Lutai, Dumiao, Chikou, Chapeng, Xinqiao, Huilong, Jinjiahui, Tangwan, Wangyuan, Yuhuangge, Guihuashu, Junyuan, Wangyang, Machengtai, Luosi, Zaogang, Chenyuan

See also
List of township-level divisions of Hubei

References

Township-level divisions of Hubei